Institute was an American rock band featuring Bush frontman Gavin Rossdale. The band's only album, Distort Yourself, was released on September 13, 2005.

History
Institute was formed in 2004 in the wake of a hiatus of lead singer Gavin Rossdale's other band, Bush. Rossdale formed Institute with Chris Traynor (who had previously played with bands including Bush and Helmet) when Bush agreed upon taking a break after their last album, Golden State. The two later enlisted the help of bassist Cache Tolman (of Rival Schools fame) and drummer Josh Freese. Freese was only enlisted temporarily, as the band needed a drummer for the recording of their first album, Distort Yourself. Rossdale later recruited Charlie Walker (known for his work with Split Lip and Chamberlain, in addition to a temporary stint in Helmet) to take Freese's spot and round out the band.

After reuniting with Interscope Records (Interscope released Bush's first three albums), Rossdale started work on Distort Yourself with Interscope Producer and Helmet frontman, Page Hamilton. Rossdale chose Hamilton to produce the band's debut album after being told Hamilton could provide the guitar sound that he was looking for. Though not known for producing rock ballads, Hamilton also proved keen towards Rossdale's lighter songs, such as "Ambulances", which featured Gavin's then-wife, Gwen Stefani, singer of No Doubt and successful solo artist.

Distort Yourself was released on September 13, 2005, and debuted at No. 81 on the Billboard Top 200 Album Charts, with first-week sales slightly over 12,000. The album's first single, "Bulletproof Skin", reached a peak of number 28 on the Billboard Mainstream Rock Chart and 29 on the Billboard Modern Rock Chart. It was also performed on various television programs and achieved significant radio play. The album also gained traction from being included in the main menu of the hockey video game NHL 06 from EA Sports and its inclusion in the big-budget motion picture Stealth.

Institute played numerous Bush songs live, including "Machinehead", "The People that We Love", "Swallowed", an acoustic version of "Comedown", and "Glycerine". They also performed on The Tyra Banks Show with Banks after Rossdale gave her some guitar lessons.

In late 2005, Institute opened for U2 on several of their Vertigo Tour dates. As of 2007, there were no plans for Institute to continue activity as a band

Band members
 Gavin Rossdale (vocals, guitar)
 Chris Traynor (guitar)
 Cache Tolman (bass)
 Charlie Walker (drums)

Discography
Studio albums
 Distort Yourself (2005) - US number 81

Singles

References

External links
 Bush official website

Musical groups established in 2004
Musical groups disestablished in 2006
American hard rock musical groups
Interscope Records artists
Musical quartets
American post-grunge musical groups
American alternative rock groups